Shen Jinjian (1875–1924) was a politician of the Republic of China, the 4th Republican mayor of Beijing. He was born in Huzhou, Zhejiang.

Bibliography
 
 

1875 births
1924 deaths
Republic of China politicians from Zhejiang
Mayors of Beijing
Politicians from Huzhou
Qing dynasty politicians from Zhejiang
Empire of China (1915–1916)